Leiosyrinx apheles is a species of sea snail, a marine gastropod mollusk in the family Raphitomidae.

Description
The length of the shell attains 25.6 mm.

Distribution
This marine species was found in deep water off Indonesia.

References

 Bouchet, P. & Sysoev, A., 2001. Typhlosyrinx-like tropical deep-water turriform gastropods (Mollusca, Gastropoda, Conoidea). Journal of Natural History 35: 1693-1715

External links
 MNHN, Paris: holotype
 Gastropods.com: Leiosyrinx apheles
 
 Intergovernmental Oceanographic Commission (IOC) of UNESCO. The Ocean Biogeographic Information System (OBIS)

apheles
Gastropods described in 2001